Amirul Hafiq Azmi (born 8 December 1996) is a Malaysian motorcycle racer. He currently competes in the Asia Road Race SS600 Championship, aboard a Yamaha YZF-R6. Hafiq competed in two seasons of the New Zealand 125GP championship in 2011 and 2012, winning the 2012 New Zealand 125GP Grand Prix title and coming 3rd overall in the NZ championship after only completing half of the season. He has competed in the Moto3 World Championship, the Red Bull MotoGP Rookies Cup in 2011 and 2012 and the CEV Moto3 series.

Career statistics

Grand Prix motorcycle racing

By season

Races by year

References

External links

 Official Website

1996 births
Living people
Malaysian motorcycle racers
Moto3 World Championship riders
Sportspeople from Kuala Lumpur